Sam Gallaway (born 16 March 1992 in Coffs Harbour, Australia) is an Australian football (soccer) player.

Career
On 22 January 2011, Gallaway made his senior debut for Newcastle against Gold Coast United.

2014-2015 season:: Although he has struggled to cement a spot in the starting 11 Gallaway is still thought of as an important member of the team. As a result of the signing of Sam Gallagher he was pushed back to the bench. Gallaway started his first game of the season in round 7 against the Western Sydney Wanderers, The game ended 1–1.
At the conclusion of the 2014–15 A-League Season, Sam Gallaway was released from the club.

References

External links
 Newcastle Jets profile

1992 births
Living people
Australian soccer players
Bonnyrigg White Eagles FC players
Newcastle Jets FC players
A-League Men players
Australian Institute of Sport soccer players
New South Wales Institute of Sport alumni
Western Sydney Wanderers FC players
Association football defenders
People from Coffs Harbour
Sportsmen from New South Wales
Soccer players from New South Wales